The 2007–08 European football season was the 104th of Sport Lisboa e Benfica's existence and the club's 74th consecutive season in the top flight of Portuguese football. The season ran from 1 July 2007 to 30 June 2008, and Benfica competed domestically in the Primeira Liga, Taça de Portugal and Taça da Liga. The club also participated in the UEFA Champions League after finishing third in the Primeira Liga the previous season.

Fernando Santos remained for a second season, which saw significant financial investment. To counter-weight the loss of influential players such as Simão, Miccoli, Giorgos Karagounis and Manuel Fernandes, Benfica signed Óscar Cardozo, David Luiz, Ángel Di María, Maxi Pereira, Cristian Rodríguez and more than ten others.

Santos remained for only two games: a UEFA Champions League qualifying match against Copenhagen and the Primeira Liga opener against Leixões. He was sacked and replaced by José Antonio Camacho, who affirmed the club's presence in top European competition and guided them to second place. In October and November, Benfica was eliminated from the Taça da Liga and the Champions League respectively, securing a UEFA Cup berth by finishing third in the latter. Over the next three months, Camacho's team became increasingly erratic, qualifying for the Portuguese Cup semi-finals but losing crucial points in the league race.

In early March, Camacho resigned after three consecutive league draws, citing his inability to motivate the club. His assistant Fernando Chalana then took over, but Benfica continued to disappoint; they were eliminated in the UEFA Cup and mired in second place in mid-March. In April, the situation deteriorated further; Benfica matched their worst league defeat in 60 years, slipped to fourth place and was knocked out of the Portuguese Cup by Sporting CP. An away draw in May's opening game left the club dangerously close to finishing fourth. One week later, fans had the bitter-sweet experience of celebrating Rui Costa's final match and seeing Benfica finish fourth, their worst finish since 2001–02.

Season summary

Pre-season
During Benfica's season-ending North American tour after the last game of 2006–07, Fernando Santos spoke to the media about his plans for the upcoming season. As promised by club president Luís Filipe Vieira, the club would spend more on new players to build a team capable of winning the title. Simão was crucial; according to Santos, "I cannot see myself without Simão". In addition, he wanted to keep Fabrizio Miccoli and sign a new striker who could be a target man. The club's first addition was winger Fábio Coentrão in March, followed by defenders Marco Zoro and David Luiz in May; the latter signed a five-year contract after performing well on loan. In June, Benfica began their promised investments, spending over €9 million on Óscar Cardozo from Newell's Old Boys and a reported €2.5 million on Gonzalo Bergessio. Both added options to an offence composed solely of Nuno Gomes and Mantorras, since Fabrizio Miccoli and Derlei did not renew their loan agreements. Breaking with tradition, Benfica did not tour abroad; they remained at the club's new training center, Benfica Campus. Santos also decided not to participate in the Teresa Herrera Trophy, since the tournament was too close to Benfica's first league match.

On 2 July, the club began their pre-season preparations, with medical tests in the morning followed by an afternoon training session attended by 3,000 supporters. From the beginning, Santos lost players who had been the backbone of the previous season's team; Giorgos Karagounis departed first and Anderson pressed for a transfer, deliberately missing a pre-season match. On the pitch, Benfica played RM Hamm Benfica on 8 July and CFR Cluj on the 21st. Santos experienced a major loss with the transfer of Simão to Atlético Madrid on 26 July. The 28-year-old winger had been with the club for six seasons and the top scorer for four; according to Santos, the prospect of losing him was a "horrible nightmare". To replace him, Benfica signed the 19-year-old Argentine Ángel Di María from Rosario Central. Before playing in the Guadiana Trophy on 3 and 5 August, Benfica lost 2–1 to Al Ahly in Egypt. At the Guadiana Trophy, Benfica drew with Real Betis and defeated Lisbon rivals Sporting CP, ending their pre-season preparations four days later with a match against Estrela da Amadora.

August–September
Benfica's first competitive match hosted Copenhagen on 14 August in the third qualifying round of the UEFA Champions League. Santos was confident in a win due to his familiarity with Copenhagen's style, since Benfica had played them twice in the past tournament. In the match, Rui Costa scored two long-range goals for a 2–1 win. Santos was pleased, despite Copenhagen's goal disconcerting his team. The next day, Benfica accepted an offer for Manuel Fernandes from Everton. His departure troubled Santos, since Fernandes had been a growing influence on the team during the pre-season. On 18 August, Benfica began their Primeira Liga campaign against Leixões. Without the injured Luisão or Ángel Di María, the club lost their first points in a 1–1 draw after a 94th-minute equaliser. The slip had an immediate impact, with Luís Filipe Vieira sacking Santos two games into the season. Santos, caught off guard, said, "I am not hurt, maybe just surprised". Benfica immediately signed José Antonio Camacho, who had managed the team from 2002 to 2004, to replace him. Camacho was happy to return, acknowledging that his friendship with Vieira played an important role in his quick hiring. In his first game, Camacho could not lead Benfica past Vitória de Guimarães, who earned a scoreless draw at Estádio da Luz. Benfica signed more players: Uruguayans Maxi Pereira and Cristian Rodríguez first, followed by Brazilian centre-back Edcarlos. In the last match of August, Benfica confirmed their place in the group stage of the Champions League with an away win in Parken Stadium. The next day, the club was drawn into group D alongside Milan, Celtic and Shakhtar Donetsk.

On 2 September, Benfica played Nacional at the Estádio da Choupana. They scored their first goal in the 17th minute, adding two more in the second half for their first league win. A delighted Camacho said, "I liked the second half a lot. We were much better altogether." After a two-week international break, Benfica resumed competition against Naval on the 15th. Cristian Rodríguez scored the opener in the 22nd minute, followed by Rui Costa a few minutes later. In the second half, Nuno Gomes scored the third and final goal. Although Camacho was pleased with the win, he was concerned about his team's early performance. Three days later, Benfica visited the San Siro to play Milan. Their opening game in the group stage did not go as planned; they conceded an early goal by Andrea Pirlo, who scored again with an assist by Filippo Inzaghi. Nuno Gomes scored in the 92nd minute of the 2–1 loss. Camacho was philosophical: "You pay for every mistake you make against a side like Milan. I don't blame our lack of experience because we were facing the best team in Europe." On 23 September, Benfica played Braga at the Municipal de Braga; both teams failed to convert several goal opportunities for a scoreless draw. Camacho was unconcerned with the result, since the league race had many matches remaining. Benfica played Estrela da Amadora at the Estádio da Reboleira in the third round of the new League Cup the following Wednesday, winning on penalty kicks and advancing to the next round. September ended with the Derby de Lisboa against Sporting CP. For the second time in a week, Benfica could not break their opponent's defence, conceding their fourth draw of the season. Camacho attributed the result to wasted opportunities: "We only failed in scoring. We had many shots; many were good, but football is like this."

October–November
October began with the club hosting Shakhtar Donetsk in a 1–0 loss to Mircea Lucescu's team on a goal by Jádson. After the game Camacho said, "We played some decent football and although at times we had five, six, seven men in the area, the ball refused to go in." On 7 October, Benfica visited the Estádio Dr. Magalhães Pessoa to play União de Leiria. Despite conceding an early goal, the partnership of Cardozo and Nuno Gomes was successful; Gomes scored twice to give Benfica the three points. After a two-week break for international matches, Benfica's season resumed on 20 October with a League Cup match against Vitória de Setúbal. Camacho made many changes in the starting eleven, which nearly cost him the game. A 12th-minute Setúbal goal was not matched until the 94th minute, by Freddy Adu.
Despite the near-loss, Camacho said, "I am satisfied with our performance. The players worked well and he had many chances to score." The following Wednesday, Benfica hosted Celtic for matchday three of the Champions League. They continued struggling to convert goal opportunities, hitting the goal post twice in quick succession before finally breaking Celtic's defence with an 87th-minute winning goal by Cardozo. Camacho praised his players for not giving up and staying calm under pressure. On 28 October, Benfica hosted Marítimo for the Primeira Liga. Although Kanú scored first for Marítimo in the eighth minute, Cardozo evened the score ten minutes later. Marítimo had an opportunity to regain the lead when Quim incurred a penalty and was sent off but his replacement, Hans-Jörg Butt, stopped the penalty kick. In the second half, Adu scored the winning goal for ten-men Benfica in the 87th minute. Camacho said about teams like Marítimo, "We have to change our mentality and never relax, because for teams like Marítimo or Vitória de Setúbal, their 'Champions League' is facing Benfica." On the last day of October, Benfica visited the Estádio do Bonfim for their second game against Vitória de Setúbal, and the remodelled team led at half-time. During the second half Setúbal, pushing hard, scored twice to knock Benfica out of the League Cup. Camacho said, "We were eliminated because they were better. It was a fair loss." 

November's first game was at the Mata Real against Paços de Ferreira. Benfica scored first with a header by Cristian Rodríguez, but Tiago Valente tied the game a few minutes later for Paços. In the 85th minute, Kostas Katsouranis scored Benfica's winning goal with an assist by Rodríguez. To Camacho, the win was "difficult but very important". On 6 November, Benfica played Celtic on the road. In their second game against the team, Benfica lost 1–0 on a goal by Aiden McGeady. With the loss, Benfica was in last place and needed to defeat Milan to remain in the Champions League. Although Camacho was optimistic, he was aware of the high stakes. On 11 November, Benfica hosted Boavista in search of their fourth consecutive win in the Primeira Liga. Cardozo scored in the first half, with Boavista tying the score in the 58th minute. Benfica then scored five goals in the final 40 minutes for a 6–1 win. After the match, Rui Costa said, "We had our fourth consecutive win in the Primeira Liga, and I think we are on the right track." After a third international break, Benfica resumed on the 24th with an away game against Académica. Lito scored first for Académica, but a free kick by Rui Costa tied the game. Académica goalkeeper Ricardo made two errors, allowing Luisão and Adu to score Benfica's second and third goals, and Camacho credited the late win to his players' perseverance and commitment. November ended with a decisive match against Milan. Andrea Pirlo scored for Benfica, but Maxi Pereira's 23rd-minute shot tied the game. Benfica's fate was determined by events in Glasgow, as Celtic defeated Shakhtar Donetsk with an added-time goal. Camacho bemoaned his team's luck: "We're a bit unhappy. For what we did in this competition I think we should have had more of a chance to go through, so for me football has not been fair to Benfica."

December–January

On 1 December, Benfica played Porto in the Clássico. Ricardo Quaresma took advantage of a 42nd-minute counterattack to dribble past David Luiz and score the winning goal for Porto. It was Benfica's first league loss at Luz since 28 January 2006. Camacho said, "We were inexperienced, failed to retain the ball and allowed counter-attacks." Three days later, Benfica travelled to Donetsk to play Shakhtar in the final match of the Champions League group stage, and Cardozo scored twice in the first 25 minutes to give Benfica the win. The club overtook Shakhtar, finishing third and qualifying for the UEFA Cup, and Camacho was pleased with the result. On 9 December, Benfica began their Portuguese Cup run by hosting Académica. The club won with goals by Luisão and Cardozo; Académica scored a consolation goal after a mistake by Benfica's goalkeeper, Butt. According to Camacho, "We suffered a bit in the second half. Académica's goal complicated things." League play resumed on 15 December, with Benfica commuting to the Estádio do Restelo to face Belenenses. The club failed to stem their hosts' momentum, giving up a 71st-minute goal for their second-straight league loss. Camacho accepted the blame: "When you lose it is always the manager's fault. I failed to pass the message to my players." Benfica ended 2007 by hosting Estrela da Amadora on 20 December, winning 3–0 with all goals scored in the second half. The win placed Benfica seven points behind league leaders Porto, who had their first league loss to Nacional. On 21 December, Benfica participated in the UEFA Cup draw for the round of 32 and was paired with German team 1. FC Nürnberg.

Benfica began the year with a match against Vitória de Setúbal. After trouble penetrating Setúbal's defense, Mantorras scored in the 71st minute. However, Setúbal rallied and tied the game for a point. The result surprised Camacho: "I though we would win. After we scored, we did not retained the ball. A team like Benfica has to do that." Two Benfica players, Luisão and Katsouranis, had a disagreement during the game; they were immediately substituted, and later suspended. On 12 January, Benfica hosted Leixões at the Luz. They struggled to control Leixões, who had the upper hand in a scoreless draw. Camacho was disappointed: "We lacked focus; it's apparent since the Champions League elimination that we do." A week later, Benfica played Feirense in the fifth round of the Portuguese Cup, advancing to the next round on a 52nd-minute goal by Cardozo. Camacho said, "I did not like the game. We are playing differently than we are training. The difference in quality between both teams should have been obvious and it was not." On 26 January, Benfica played Vitória de Guimarães at the Estádio D. Afonso Henriques. They scored in the eighth minute, when Cardozo converted a free kick from 30 meters out. Di María assisted Maxi Pereira on a second goal, with Guimarães scoring in the 60th minute. In extra time, Cardozo scored his second goal on a mistake by Nilson.

February–March
February was a busy month for the club. Benfica trailed Porto by 11 points in the Primeira Liga, with crucial European and domestic cup matches between league matches. The first was on 2 February against Nacional. Like past home performances, Benfica failed to score and lost points in another scoreless draw. Camacho tried to explain his team's performance: "We did not lack attitude, but at home, we sometimes feel disturbed, pressured. We played two forwards and we still did not score." He saw his first white handkerchiefs, an action commonly seen as a request for resignation. Benfica regained their feet with a home win against Paços de Ferreira in the Portuguese Cup. An opening goal by Pedrinha in the second minute was answered with an equaliser by Cardozo before half-time. In the second half, Cardozo, Rui Costa and Nuno Assis scored to send Benfica to the quarter-finals. On 14 February, Benfica hosted 1. FC Nürnberg in the first of two games against the German team. Recent acquisition Ariza Makukula scored the only goal in the 43rd minute, a 20-meter strike which fooled goalkeeper Jaromír Blažek. Camacho called the narrow victory important. Three days later, Benfica played Naval at the Municipal José Bento Pessoa. Cristian Rodríguez scored the club's opening goal in the 18th minute, with László Sepsi assisting Nuno Assis on a second goal in the final minute. On 21 February, Benfica played the second leg of their European double-header with Nürnberg. The Bundesliga side scored twice in seven minutes during the second half before Cardozo scored in the 89th minute and Di María tied the game in the 92nd, sending Benfica to the round of 16 with Spanish side Getafe. Camacho said, "Benfica made some defensive errors in the second half that put them in a tough spot. They managed to react and continued their search for goals until they arrived." In domestic-league play, Benfica hosted Braga on 24 January. Braga scored first with a fifth-minute goal by Zé Manel, with Luisão tying the game in the 21sth minute. The draw complicated the league race, with Porto increasing their lead. Camacho said, "Benfica did everything they could win. They tried to score from every way possible, but could not". The club ended the month with a 2–0 victory over Moreirense in the Portuguese Cup, sending them to the semi-finals.

Benfica began March competing at three levels: the Primeira Liga, the Portuguese Cup and the UEFA Cup. Their first game was at the Estádio José Alvalade against Sporting CP. Managed by Paulo Bento, the hosts scored the opening goal in the 11th minute with a header by Simon Vukčević. In the 40th minute, Rui Costa's corner kick allowed Cardozo to head in the tying goal. Benfica held second place, five points ahead of Sporting. For Camacho, the result was "very important because we kept our advantage, allowing us to remain in second place". The following Thursday, Benfica hosted Getafe in the UEFA Cup. The match quickly soured for the club when Cardozo was sent off in the ninth minute, and Rubén de la Red scored Getafe's first goal in the 25th minute. During the second half Pablo Hernández added another, and Mantorras scored a 76th-minute consolation goal for Benfica. Camacho said, "We started poorly because Getafe has a good team. With Cardozo's ejection, things got more complicated. In the second half, Benfica was better, the players fought and showed we have a chance to eliminate them." On 9 March, Benfica hosted União de Leiria. They conceded an opening goal in the 42nd minute, scoring two second-half goals in five minutes: one each by Zoro and Cardozo. Serge N'Gal scored a 69th-minute equaliser for the draw. The result had repercussions, as Camacho resigned: "I cannot do anything else to improve this team's performance." His resignation, so late in the season, caught Benfica's management by surprise. They opted to not replace him, nominating his assistant Fernando Chalana as manager. Chalana accepted the challenge: "I am here through thick and thin." His first game as manager was against Getafe on the road on 12 March. Benfica had to score two and allow none to progress; Makukula hit the post in the sixth minute, and Getafe qualified with a 77th-minute goal by Juan Ángel Albín. Four days later, Benfica played Marítimo at Barreiros, with Cardozo scoring his 19th goal of the season in the 26th minute. In the second half, Ytalo scored a 75th-minute equaliser for Marítimo. Chalana said, "We had a great first half. We dominated and honestly I was not expecting Marítimo's goal. I was sad with the way it appeared. We did everything to win." The fourth consecutive draw cost Benfica their lead over Vitória de Guimarães for second place. Back from international break, the club hosted Paços de Ferreira on 30 March in a 4–1 win. At half-time, the score was 1–1, but Cardozo and Rui Costa's second-half goals gave Benfica their first domestic win in March.

April–May

As the season wound down, Benfica was battling for a direct qualification for the Champions League with six matches remaining. On 6 April, the club played Boavista on the road. The hosts were undefeated at home since October, but Benfica had an opportunity to gain ground over Vitória de Guimarães (who had lost points hours earlier). Neither team could penetrate the other's defence, despite Boavista's 24th-minute penalty kick, and the game ended in a scoreless draw. Chalana was highly critical of the refereeing: "What happened here was a disgrace." The following Friday, Benfica hosted Académica. In the fourth minute Luisão lost the ball to Miguel Pedro, who scored for Académica. At the 30-minute mark, Markus Berger added another, and in the second half, Luis Aguiar scored a third. It was the fourth time in Benfica's history that they lost by three goals at home, matching their worst result in the Primeira Liga. They had lost 3–0 to Boavista in 1998–99 and 4–1 to Sporting CP in 1938–39 and 1947–48. Chalana was resigned: "There are days like this." With the loss, Benfica had lost 18 points in Luz, was 21 points behind Porto and fell from second to fourth place. On 16 April, the club visited the Alvalade for the Portuguese Cup semi-finals. Benfica began the game well, with first-half goals by Rui Costa and Nuno Gomes. Sporting mobilized in the second half, scoring three goals in 12 minutes. Rodríguez tied the game for Benfica before Sporting scored two more goals, eliminating Benfica. Chalana attributed the loss to poor refereeing: "We started strong, scored two goals and could have scored a third if the referee had signalled a penalty over Luisão. It would be the 3–0 and would have killed the game." Four days later, Benfica played Porto at the Estádio do Dragão. Lisandro López scored goals in the seventh and 80th minutes to give Porto a 2–0 win, increasing the difference between them to 24 points. Despite amassing five out of a possible 15 points since becoming manager and trailing second-place Vitória de Guimarães by four points, Chalana remained hopeful: "Nothing is lost, Benfica will use all their weapons to win the remaining nine points." The club's last April match was a 2–0 victory over Belenenses, with Chalana praising his players' performance against "a very good team".

In May, Benfica had two games in which to overcome a four-point deficit. On the fourth, they played Estrela da Amadora away. Benfica never beat Estrela's goalkeeper, Pedro Alves, drawing 0–0 and losing crucial points. Chalana said, "We started the first half somewhat nervous. Not playing our best. However, the second half was different, we did everything to win, created opportunities but the ball just would not go in." The draw left Benfica dependent on others to reach second place; even if they won, Sporting had to lose and Guimarães had to lose or draw. On 11 May, the club hosted Vitória de Setúbal. The match, attracting over 54,000 fans for Rui Costa's last game, was a 3–0 Benfica win. Sporting and Guimarães also won and Benfica finished fourth, missing a Champions League berth. It was their fifth finish outside the top three after fourth-place finishes in 1939–40, 1940–41 and 2001–02 and a sixth-place finish in 2000–01. Chalana said, "Benfica is very big. We failed to reach our objectives, but nearly sold out the stadium today." The club's season ended with an African tour in which they defeated a team with players from Sal and São Vicente on 17 May and the Angolan national team two days later.

Competitions

Overall record

Primeira Liga

League table

Results by round

Matches

Taça de Portugal

Taça da Liga

Third round

Fourth round

UEFA Champions League

Third qualifying round

Group D

UEFA Cup

Round of 32

Round of 16

Friendlies

Player statistics
The squad for the season consisted of the players listed in the tables below, as well as staff member Fernando Santos (manager), José António Camacho (manager), Fernando Chalana, (assistant manager and later manager), Jorge Rosário (assistant manager), Pepe Cárcelan (assistant manager), Shéu Han (assistant manager), Bruno Moura (physiotherapist) and Ricardo Santos (scout).

|}

Transfers

In

In by loan

Out

Out on loan

References
 Specific

 General
 

S.L. Benfica seasons
Benfica